Scott LoBaido (born April 6, 1965) is an American artist known for patriotic, US Flag, and political themed paintings and sculptures.  LoBaido is currently based out of Staten Island New York.

Early life
Scott LoBaido was born St. Vincent’s Hospital in the West Brighton neighborhood in Staten Island. LoBaido attended New Dorp High School.

Tours

Flags Across America
In 2006, LoBaido embarked on his Flag Across America tour.  He traveled across United States in a 1989 Chevy Suburban, painting a US flag on a roof top in each of the 50 states.  In order to make the tour possible, he relied on donations of paint, food, and money.  During September ABC news named him person of the week.

Second Flags Across America
In 2015, Scott LoBaido conducted a second Flags Across America tour.  This tour he painted a US Flag on an American Legion or a VFW post in every state.   The tour began on February 21, 2015, at American Legion Post 202 in Fayetteville, North Carolina. In 2016 during the 117th National Convention of Veterans of Foreign Wars of the United States, LoBaido was presented with VFW Americanism Award in recognition of the VFWs and American Legions that were painting in 2015.

Select works
In 2010, LoBaido and assistants painted what was then the largest mural on the roof of Lamons Gasket Company near Hobby Airport. He began Flag Day June 14 and completed it on Independence Day July 4.  The mural was 150,000 square feet, it used 900 gallons of paint and cost nearly $50,000.  LoBaido called the painting a birthday gift to America. In 2015 Scott LoBaido has built memorial tributes to the 24 people that died on Staten Island from Hurricane Sandy called.  LoBaido then appeared on Steve Harvey's Veterans Day episode and presented Steve Harvey with a painting of Harvey with a US Flag background.  In 2018 LoBaido sculpted "Breaking Through Barriers".  "Breaking Through Barriers" is public arts project that promotes Autism Awareness.

Politically inspired works
LoBaido has been a vocal supporter of the 45th president of the United States, Donald Trump.  In 2016 LoBaido's painting of Donald Trump was seen held by Eric Trump. LoBaido sculpted a 12-foot-tall letter T for another Staten Island resident's lawn.  The T, which was in support of the Donald Trump's 2016 presidential campaign, was torched and investigated by the New York City Fire Department. "POTUS 45" is a painting by LoBaido in which Donald Trump is fit and muscular.

References

1965 births
Living people
People from Staten Island
21st-century American painters
Painters from New York (state)